Zamanabad (also Romanized as Zamānābād) is a village in Qahab-e Shomali Rural District, in the Central District of Isfahan County, Isfahan Province, Iran. At the 2006 census, its population was 98, in 28 families.

References 

Populated places in Isfahan County